Ischyrolamprina is a genus of leaf beetles in the subfamily Eumolpinae. They are found in South America.

Ischyrolamprina was originally described as a subgenus of Ischyrolampra, but was later split from it as a separate genus.

Species
Subgenus Ischyrolamprina Bechyné, 1950
 Ischyrolamprina fulgens (Lefèvre, 1891)
 Ischyrolamprina lampros (Lefèvre, 1888)
 Ischyrolamprina peruana (Lefèvre, 1891)
 Ischyrolamprina rufitarsis (Bechyné, 1951)

Subgenus Pseudoischyrolampra Bechyné, 1954
 Ischyrolamprina perla (Bechyné, 1950)
 Ischyrolamprina splendicans (Bechyné, 1950)

References

Eumolpinae
Chrysomelidae genera
Beetles of South America